Jagath Chandana Rajapakse from the Nanyang Technological University was named Fellow of the Institute of Electrical and Electronics Engineers (IEEE) in 2012 for contributions to computational techniques for magnetic resonance imaging.

References

Fellow Members of the IEEE
Living people
Year of birth missing (living people)
Place of birth missing (living people)